Salagena fuscata is a moth in the family Cossidae. It is found in Ghana and Ivory Coast.

References

Natural History Museum Lepidoptera generic names catalog

Metarbelinae
Moths described in 1929